Samuel Birch (1813–1885) was a British Egyptologist and antiquary.

Samuel Birch may also refer to:

Lamorna Birch (Samuel John Birch, 1869–1955), English artist
Samuel Birch (athlete) (born 1963), Liberian Olympic sprinter
Samuel Birch (Lord Mayor of London) (1757–1840), Lord Mayor of London
 Samuel Birch (military officer) (1735–1811), compiler of the Book of Negroes and namesake of Birchtown, Nova Scotia